John Lotas (September 14, 1920 – August 18, 1995)  was the original producer of Hal Holbrook’s “Mark Twain Tonight!” in New York City. He was born in Springfield, Massachusetts. Lotas was a voice-over talent for Paramount News and was an original follower and contributor to the Sri Atmananda Memorial School (Austin, Texas). For many years he headed Lotas Productions, a recording studio and production company in New York City.

1920 births
1995 deaths